The National Civil Defence Cadet Corps (NCDCC) of Singapore was formed in 2005 and is currently the newest recognised member of the National Uniformed Group. The creation of this Uniformed Group was initiated by the Ministry of Home Affairs in response to the need for the young leaders of tomorrow to have a firm pillar and grounding in Singapore's firm belief of Total Defence.

Together with the National Police Cadet Corps, both corps have their Headquarters located at the Home Team Academy.

History

NCDCC was introduced in 12 secondary schools starting from January 2005. For the pilot phase, 38 cadets completed the very first NCO Course while 22 teachers were commissioned as the pioneer batch of NCDCC officers after their completion of the first Officer Basic Course. On 23 December 2005, 22 cadets attended the conversion course and became the pioneer batch of Cadet Lieutenants or CLTs for short.

Civil Defence is one of the current six pillars of Total Defence; it refers to the protection of the Singapore people by the Singapore Civil Defence Force (SCDF).  NCDCC is a component of the Home Team Cadet Corps Initiative.

Mission and Vision

Mission

"To develop and empower our youths to be active and concerned citizens advocating life-saving skills."

Vision

"A Choice Uniformed Group Of Community First Responders."

Pledge

"We, members of the National Civil Defence Cadet Corps,

pledge to serve our community.

We take pride in our training and uniform.

We are disciplined and responsible for our actions.

We are loyal to the Nation."

NCDCC Specialisation Model

Launched on 8 April 2017 during the 12th NCDCC Day Parade, the NCDCC Specialisation Model aims to provide all Secondary Three NCDCC cadets an option to specialise in either Fire Safety, Medical Response or Urban Search and Rescue Specialisation Courses based on their strengths and interests. These courses are co-developed with and conducted by the respective field specialists, modelling after the key functional areas of the Singapore Civil Defence Force (SCDF). Cadets are exposed to authentic learning experiences through realistic simulation and case studies to enable them to take on the role of Community First Responders, in line with the SGSecure Movement to assist themselves and people around them in times of emergency. Cadets are also trained in skills to be a more effective communicator and leader in their units.

NCDCC's Specialisation Model is the top 2 nominations recognised as a Best Practice, under the Organisation Development category, for the inaugural MOE HQ Best Practice Awards 2017 which aims to recognize HQ Divisions that have implemented best-in-class practices which are aligned to MOE's mission, vision and values. The MOE HQ BPA Award is aligned to the Public Service Transformation (PST) Awards 2018 – Best Practice Award Category.

The Specialisation Model also succeeds the similar Senior Non-Commissioned Officer Course (SNCO) that have been conducted previously since the formation of the Corps.

Fire Safety Specialisation 
The Fire Safety Specialisation Course empowers cadets with the skills and knowledge of general fire safety standards and provisions. Cadets go through a series of practical activities and learning journeys to have a first-hand experience in the operations of fire protection devices, fire drill and enforcement checks.

In addition, cadets are also introduced to the concept of Fire Investigation to learn from realistic simulations and cases simulating the damaging effects of fire. At the end of the course, cadets can assist their school unit and community as fire safety ambassadors.

The trainers of the course, the SCDF Fire & Rescue Specialists, will also share their real life experiences through cases they have attended to in the course of their duties.

Upon successful completion of the course, cadets will be awarded with an iron on tab with the words 'FIRE SAFETY' printed on it that can be worn on the left side of their No.4 uniform under the rank, signifying them as cadets having passed out with the required knowledge and expertise in the Fire Safety Specialisation Course.

Medical Response Specialisation 
The Medical Response Specialisation Course equips cadets with case studies of common emergencies and in-depth approach to perform critical emergency interventions. The course also imparts theoretical knowledge and practical skills for the resuscitation of collapsed adult and infant victims and the use of Automated External Defibrillator (AED) to restore normal heart rhythms.

The SCDF paramedics and NCDCC personnel who have responded to real life emergencies will be invited to share their real life experiences in applying the triangle of life to save someone's life.

Upon successful completion of the course, cadets will receive a Provider Certificate in Standard First Aid, Basic Cardiac Life Support (BCLS) and AED, which are accredited by the Singapore Resuscitation & First Aid Council. Additionally, cadets will be awarded with an iron on tab with the words 'MEDICAL RESPONSE' printed on it that can be worn on the left side of their No.4 uniform under the rank, signifying them as cadets having passed out with the required knowledge and expertise in the Medical Response Specialisation Course.

Urban Search and Rescue Specialisation 
The Urban Search and Rescue (USAR) Specialisation Course involves the searching of victims, accessing into voids, providing medical stabilisation and the extrication of victims trapped under structural collapse. SCDF's USAR capability is internationally accredited by the United Nations Disaster Assistance Council. Under the codename 'Ops Lionheart Contingent', SCDF's elite Disaster Assistance and Rescue Team (DART) travel to different parts of Asia Pacific to render USAR assistance to countries affected by disaster.

The participants of the NCDCC USAR Specialisation Course will be introduced to the overview of USAR operations, basic search and rescue skills, hazard identification and psychological first aid. Participants will be taught how to recognise risks associated with collapsed structure and go through simulation exercise to render help and evacuate surface trapped victims away from risk areas using simple rescue tools from well-known rescue tools companies such as LUKAS.

The NCDCC USAR Specialisation Course is supported by the United Nations International Search and Rescue Advisory Group (INSARAG). This is the first course involving secondary school students to be given the prestigious recognition.

Upon successful completion of the course, cadets will be awarded with an iron on tab with the words 'URBAN SEARCH AND RESCUE' printed on it that can be worn on the left side of their No.4 uniform under the rank, signifying them as cadets having passed out with the required knowledge and expertise in the Urban Search and Rescue Course.

Rank structure

Rank structures are implemented in all Uniform Groups with the common ambition of motivating the cadets and encouraging them to be on a constant roll and quest for trying out new things.

Cadets

All cadets will start off holding the rank of private, after which will be promoted subsequently, however promotion is based on badges count and completion of courses. The ranks are as follows:
Private (PTE)
Lance Corporal (LCP)
Corporal (CPL)
Sergeant (SGT)
Staff Sergeant (SSG)
Warrant Officer (WO)

Cadet Officers

Cadet officers are cadets who have graduated from their secondary school and are currently studying in an post-secondary institution, and have pass out from the Cadet Lieutenant Course. The ranks are as follows:
Cadet Lieutenant (CLT)
Senior Cadet Lieutenant (S/CLT)

Officers

Officers in NCDCC are teachers assigned from their respective schools to aid in the unit. They can also be Honorary Instructors or Honorary Officers directly assigned by HQ NCDCC. The ranks are as follows:
Lieutenant (LTA)
Captain (CPT)
Major (MAJ)

As part of the rank, the letters NCDCC are embroidered which forms part of the Corps Insignia.

Uniform

No.1 Ceremonial Dress
-

Worn by the Guard-Of-Honour contingent during parade.

No.2 Mess Uniform*
-

While not currently in use by NCDCC, members of the Singapore Civil Defence Force use this uniform for dining in events.

No.3 Working Dress
-

Worn by cadet officers and officers, and at times field instructors.

No.4 Field Dress
-

Issued to all members of the corp. Worn for everyday training.

No.5 Formal uniform
-

Worn usually by officers during formal events.

Membership

Newly enrolled Secondary One students from schools with an NCDCC unit set up, regardless of their race, religion, gender and academic ability, can choose to become members of the corps. While units are allowed to enroll students using methods to their discretion, this must be done so in consultation with their respective schools and if the need arises with the corps' headquarters. Units would also need to submit a nominal roll to the corps' headquarters for monitoring purposes. While there are no restrictions regarding membership for Singapore Citizens and permanent residents, foreign students membership will have to be approved by the relevant ministry. Members are expected to be part of the corps throughout their four or five years of their secondary school education. However, members may be discharged from the corps based on valid reasons.

Units

Below is the list of secondary schools that have NCDCC units.

Based on the 2018 school units list, there are four sectors which oversees a total of 35 units. The list is expected to grow within 2019 with more units to be formed in the coming years.

North East Sector
 Beatty Secondary Sch
 Bowen Secondary Sch
 Edgefield Secondary Sch
Kuo Chuan Presbyterian Secondary School
 Montfort Secondary School
 Pei Hwa Secondary School
Northlight School

East Sector:
 Bedok South Secondary Schl
 CHIJ Katong Convent
East Spring Secondary School
Meridian Secondary School
Pasir Ris Secondary School
Saint Anthony's Canossian School
Saint Hilda's Secondary School
Temasek Secondary School

North Sector:
 Admiralty Secondary School
 Canberra Secondary School
 Christ Church Secondary School
 Evergreen Secondary School
Presbyterian High School
Orchid Park Secondary School 
Spectra Secondary School
Yishun Secondary School
Yishun Town Secondary School
Woodlands Secondary School

West Sector:
 Anglo-Chinese School (Independent)
Boon Lay Secondary School
Juying Secondary School
West Spring Secondary School
Yuhua Secondary School
Yuan Ching Secondary School
Queensway Secondary School

See also 
 Ministry of Education (Singapore)
 Ministry of Home Affairs (Singapore)
 Singapore Civil Defence Force
 Education in Singapore
 Co-curricular activity (Singapore)

References

External links
 Ministry of Education Official Website
 Ministry of Home Affairs Official Website
 SCDF Official Website
 NCDCC Official Website

Organisations of the Singapore Government